Brigadier Basil John Andrew (15 October 1894 – 28 April 1941) was an officer in the Australian Army during both the First and Second World Wars. He was the Deputy Adjutant-General of I Australian Corps in Greece, before he died in Alexandria, Egypt, of a heart attack.

Early years
Andrew was born in Melbourne, Victoria, on 15 October 1894, the son of John Arthur and Catherine Mary Andrew of Launceston, Tasmania.  Educated at Scotch College, Launceston, upon graduation he entered the Royal Military College, Duntroon as an Australian Army officer cadet.

Military career
Andrew was commissioned as an officer after the outbreak of the First World War, and was attached to the 12th Battalion of the Australian Imperial Force for active service overseas. By the war's end he had been promoted to captain.

Returning to Australia Andrew was stationed at Launceston, then Western Australia, South Australia and Victoria. With the outbreak of the Second World War, he served with the Australian Staff Corps.

Personal life
Andrew married Ethyl Kate Petterd. On 28 April 1941, he died of a heart attack and was survived by his wife Ethyl and his son John.

References

External links
Australian War Memorial
Roll of Honour 
First World War Embarkation Roll pdf
Photograph – 1918
Funeral: P08806.003; P08806.006; P08806.009; P08806.011; P08806.012; Alexandria, 29 April 1941
Grave, Alexandria (Chatby) Military Cemetery, findagrave.com
Brigadier Basil John Andrew, generals.dk

1894 births
1941 deaths
Australian brigadiers
Australian military personnel of World War I
Australian Army personnel of World War II
People from Launceston, Tasmania
Royal Military College, Duntroon graduates